The enzyme Triacylglycerol lipase (also Triglyceride lipase, EC 3.1.1.3;systematic name triacylglycerol acylhydrolase) catalyses the hydrolysis of ester linkages of triglycerides: 

 triacylglycerol + H2O  diacylglycerol + a carboxylate

These lipases are widely distributed in animals, plants and prokaryotes. This family was also called class 3 lipases as they are only distantly related to other lipase families.

Human proteins containing this domain 
DAGLA;     DAGLB;     LOC221955;
The pancreatic enzyme acts only on an ester-water interface.

Nomenclature 
Other names include lipase, butyrinase, tributyrinase, Tween hydrolase, steapsin, triacetinase, tributyrin esterase, Tweenase, amno N-AP, Takedo 1969-4-9, Meito MY 30, Tweenesterase, GA 56, capalase L, triglyceride hydrolase, triolein hydrolase, tween-hydrolyzing esterase, amano CE, cacordase, triglyceridase, triacylglycerol ester hydrolase, amano P, amano AP, PPL, glycerol-ester hydrolase, GEH, meito Sangyo OF lipase, hepatic lipase, lipazin, post-heparin plasma protamine-resistant lipase, salt-resistant post-heparin lipase, heparin releasable hepatic lipase, amano CES, amano B, tributyrase, triglyceride lipase, liver lipase, hepatic monoacylglycerol acyltransferase).

See also 
 Pancreatic lipase
 Gastric lipase
 Lingual lipase

References

External links 
 

EC 3.1.1
Protein domains
Protein families
Peripheral membrane proteins